Waldemar Jesus Acosta Ferreira (born August 25, 1986, in Juan Lacaze) is a Uruguayan professional footballer who plays as a forward for C.D. Águila.

Club career
Acosta has had a journeyman's career with several spells outside Uruguay, including Ecuador, El Salvador, Guatemala, Malta and Mexico.

Águila
Acosta signed with Águila of the Salvadoran Primera División for the Apertura 2018 tournament. Acosta finished the tournament as one of the best goal scorers, scoring 12 goals in 21 matches.

In November 2018, Acosta suffered a severe injury in a match against Audaz (2–2 draw) in the first leg of the quarterfinals of the Apertura 2018.

Honours
Técnico Universitario
Ecuadorian Serie B: 2011

C.D. Águila
 Primera División: Clausura 2019

References

External links
 
 

1986 births
Living people
People from Juan Lacaze
Association football forwards
Uruguayan footballers
Uruguayan expatriate footballers
Deportivo Colonia players
C.D. Técnico Universitario footballers
S.D. Quito footballers
Club Celaya footballers
C.S.D. Macará footballers
Fuerza Amarilla S.C. footballers
Guayaquil City F.C. footballers
Club Plaza Colonia de Deportes players
Xelajú MC players
L.D.U. Portoviejo footballers
Birkirkara F.C. players
C.D. Águila footballers
Guabirá players
Ecuadorian Serie A players
Ecuadorian Serie B players
Ascenso MX players
Uruguayan Primera División players
Liga Nacional de Fútbol de Guatemala players
Maltese Premier League players
Primera División de Fútbol Profesional players
Bolivian Primera División players
Expatriate footballers in Ecuador
Expatriate footballers in Mexico
Expatriate footballers in El Salvador
Expatriate footballers in Guatemala
Expatriate footballers in Malta
Expatriate footballers in Bolivia
Uruguayan expatriate sportspeople in Ecuador
Uruguayan expatriate sportspeople in Mexico
Uruguayan expatriate sportspeople in El Salvador
Uruguayan expatriate sportspeople in Guatemala
Uruguayan expatriate sportspeople in Bolivia